Nieuw-Haamstede  is a hamlet in the Dutch province of Zeeland. It is a part of the municipality of Schouwen-Duiveland, and lies about 25 km north of Middelburg.

It was built before 1940 as a holiday neighbourhood in the dunes belonging to Haamstede.

References
 

Populated places in Zeeland
Schouwen-Duiveland